Ross E. Doughty (June 27, 1910 – March 18, 2000) was a justice of the Supreme Court of Texas from October 1, 1975 to December 31, 1976.

References

Justices of the Texas Supreme Court
1910 births
2000 deaths
20th-century American judges